Strabane (GNI) railway station served Strabane, County Tyrone in the United Kingdom.

The Londonderry and Enniskillen Railway opened the station on 19 April 1847. It was taken over by the Great Northern Railway (Ireland) in 1883.

The Finn Valley Railway began Irish gauge services from this station to Stranorlar railway station from 7 September 1863. The two stations were linked by a footbridge.

It closed on 15 February 1965.

The location is now occupied by an Asda car park.

Routes

References

Disused railway stations in County Tyrone
Railway stations opened in 1847
Railway stations closed in 1965
1847 establishments in Ireland
1965 disestablishments in Northern Ireland
Railway stations in Great Britain opened in 1847
Railway stations in Northern Ireland opened in the 19th century